Route 36 is a state highway in Monmouth County, New Jersey, United States. From Long Branch, the route follows the Atlantic Ocean north to Sea Bright and turns west, running to the south of the Raritan Bay. Route 36 ends in Keyport at an interchange with the Garden State Parkway and Route 35. It varies in width from a six-lane divided highway to a two-lane undivided road. The route is signed east–west between Eatontown and Long Branch and north–south between Long Branch and Keyport.

Route 36 was created in 1927 to run from Keyport to Highlands along a winding route that went through the downtowns of Keyport, Keansburg, and Atlantic Highlands. In 1929, the route was modified to bypass the downtown areas. Route 36 was extended to Eatontown in 1940 with only the portion within Eatontown and West Long Branch built. The remainder of the route was created with the takeover of Joline Avenue in Long Branch and Ocean Avenue in Monmouth Beach and Sea Bright from Monmouth County on October 17, 1972, and the completion of Ocean Boulevard in Long Branch in late 1983.

Route description

Route 36 begins at the intersection with County Route 51 (Hope Road) and Exit 105 of the Garden State Parkway in Eatontown, heading east along a four-lane divided highway. Soon after beginning, it features ramps that provide access to Route 18 in both the westbound and eastbound directions. The route widens to six lanes and crosses County Route 547 (Wyckoff Road). After that intersection, Route 36 passes by the Monmouth Mall and intersects Route 35 at the former Eatontown Circle, which has been reconstructed to an at-grade intersection with ramps. Route 36 continues east through commercial development and crosses into West Long Branch, where it comes to an intersection with Route 71. The route heads northeast, becoming Monmouth Park Highway, and crosses County Route 547 (Eatontown Boulevard/Broadway). Route 36 meets County Route 11 (Oceanport Avenue) and comes to the entrance to the Monmouth Park Racetrack.

Route 36 narrows to a two-lane undivided highway and crosses into Long Branch, where it becomes Joline Avenue. In Long Branch, the route crosses County Route 29 (Myrtle Avenue) and NJ Transit’s North Jersey Coast Line.  Route 36 heads toward the Atlantic Ocean, where at the intersection with County Route 57 (Ocean Boulevard), the route turns north and runs along the Atlantic Ocean on Ocean Boulevard, a four-lane divided road. Route 36 intersects County Route 29 (Atlantic Avenue) and crosses into Monmouth Beach, where it narrows to a two-lane undivided road and takes on the name Ocean Avenue.  It continues through Monmouth Beach, where it runs just west of the Sea Bright–Monmouth Beach Seawall separating the road from the ocean, and enters Sea Bright. Here, Route 36 heads north onto a narrow peninsula between the Shrewsbury River and the Atlantic Ocean, meeting the eastern terminus of County Route 520 (Rumson Road). The route continues north along the peninsula to a trumpet interchange that provides access to Gateway National Recreation Area at Sandy Hook.

Route 36 turns west and crosses the Shrewsbury River on the four-lane Highlands–Sea Bright Bridge, continuing into Highlands. It intersects County Route 8 at an interchange and continues west on Navesink Avenue, a four-lane, divided highway with a Jersey barrier and some intersections featuring jughandles that runs a short distance to the south of the Raritan Bay. The route then forms the border between  Highlands and Middletown Township, with Highlands to the north and Middletown Township to the south. Route 36 intersects two separate sections of County Route 8, Linden Avenue and Ocean Boulevard soon after, before intersecting County Route 8B (Navesink Avenue) and fully entering Middletown Township. The name changes to Memorial Parkway and Route 36 crosses into Atlantic Highlands. In Atlantic Highlands, the route intersects County Route 8A (Valley Drive East) and another section of County Route 8 (First Avenue). It crosses back into Middletown Township and meets the eastern terminus of County Route 516 (Leonardville Road).

Route 36 passes under Normandy Road, which serves as a road and railroad link between the two sections of Naval Weapons Station Earle, with an entrance present to Normandy Road. The route drops the Memorial Parkway name and meets County Route 36 (Thompson Avenue). It then crosses County Route 7 (Palmer Avenue/Main Street) and forms the border between Hazlet Township to the south and Keansburg to the north. Route 36 eventually fully enters Hazlet Township and intersects County Route 7 (Munroe Avenue) again. The route then forms the border between Hazlet Township to the south and Union Beach to the north and passes over Natco Lake.  It intersects County Route 39 (Union Avenue) and then County Route 6 (Stone Road), where Route 36 fully enters Hazlet Township again. The route crosses County Route 516 (Middle Avenue) and passes between an Academy Bus Lines terminal to the north and a shopping center that contains a park and ride lot to the south before it enters Keyport. Route 36 intersects County Route 4 (Broad Street) and continues to its terminus at an interchange with Route 35 and the Garden State Parkway at Exit 117.  The overall shape of Route 36 is that of a backwards C.

History

What is now Route 36 from Atlantic Highlands to Long Branch was part of the Jersey Coast Way, which ran from the Staten Island Ferry to Cape May. Route 36 was established by the Laws of 1927, Chapter 319 to run between Keyport and Highlands. The route was to run up Broad Street from Front Street in Keyport, follow First Street east to the Second Street Bridge, and run east along Stone Road to Keansburg. It would pass through Keansburg on Church Street and follow Shore Road east to the Belford drawbridge and then on through more rural fields and meadows. Route 36 would head along Center Avenue from Ocean View to Atlantic Highlands, where it would turn north on First Avenue and run east along Ocean Boulevard to Navesink Avenue in Highlands. The route would follow Navesink Avenue east to the drawbridge over the Shrewsbury River. This routing as proposed was considered impractical as it consisted entirely of local roads, went through the downtown areas of Keyport, Keansburg and Atlantic Highlands, and contained many hazardous sharp curves.  This was remedied in 1929, when Route 36 was designated to bypass the downtowns and sharp curves.

In 1940, Route 36 was extended south to Route 35 in Eatontown, but only a portion was constructed in Eatontown and West Long Branch.  As a result, this extension remained unsigned in the 1953 New Jersey state highway renumbering. Additional parts of this extension were taken over on October 17, 1972, with the takeover of County Route 9, which was Ocean Avenue between the Long Branch/Monmouth Beach border and the Sea Bright/Middletown Township border, and County Route 44, which was Joline Avenue between Branchport Avenue and Ocean Avenue in Long Branch. County Route 9 was initially taken over as a county highway by resolution of the Monmouth County Board of Chosen Freeholders on September 1, 1903 running from Rumson Road north to the Middletown Township border at Sandy Hook. It was extended to the southern border of Monmouth Beach by two resolutions dated February 4, 1920. County Route 44 was taken over as a county road on October 18, 1939. Following the takeover of County Routes 9 and 44, a short gap of Route 36 remained in Long Branch (Ocean Avenue between Joline Avenue and the Monmouth Beach border) that was municipally maintained; with the completion of Ocean Boulevard in late 1983 that link has been added.

Between 2008 and 2011, the Highlands–Sea Bright Bridge, which was originally a drawbridge, was replaced with a fixed span with a clearance  higher than its predecessor.

In popular culture
The "Marina Diner" from the 1997 film Chasing Amy, now known as the King Arms II Diner, is located along Route 36 in Belford.  Additionally, the "Quick Stop Groceries" and "RST Video" stores from the 1994 film Clerks are located just north of the highway's intersection with Leonard Avenue in Leonardo.  Both films were created by former New Jersey resident Kevin Smith.

Major intersections

See also

References

External links

New Jersey Roads: Route 36
New Jersey Highway Ends: Route 36
Speed Limits for Route 36

036
Transportation in Monmouth County, New Jersey